Robert Fleming Blyth (16 October 1869 – 7 February 1941) was a Scottish footballer and manager for Portsmouth from 1901 to 1904.

Football career
Blyth was born in Glenbuck, and was a member of the Glenbuck Cherrypickers, playing alongside members of his extended family. From there he was scouted by the Rangers, playing as a wing-half (1891–1894), followed by Preston North End (1894–1899), a brief spell at Dundee (1897), and Portsmouth (1899–1901).

He became player–manager of Portsmouth in 1901, winning the 1901-02 Southern League title. After retiring from his post as manager, he later served Portsmouth as director and chairman. According to the Portsmouth Evening News, Blyth was "the only man to rise from professional player to be chairman of his club through all the intermediate positions: Captain, player-manager, manager, director, and vice-chairman."

Personal life and family
Blyth grew up in a poor mining village which managed to produce a number of football stars. Five of his nephews played professionally, including future Liverpool manager Bill Shankly  and Bob Shankly, sons of his sister, Barbara. His brother William Blyth also played for Portsmouth.

He married Isabella Taylor, with whom he had daughters Mary and Janet, and a son, Robert Blyth, who played for both Portsmouth and Southampton in the 1920s.

Blyth was also a licensee and operated several hotels in Portsmouth. He died peacefully at St James' Hospital, Portsmouth, in 1941.

Honours

As manager
Portsmouth
 Southern League championships: 1901-02

References

Rangers Player History - B

Further reading

1869 births
1941 deaths
Footballers from East Ayrshire
Scottish footballers
Rangers F.C. players
Preston North End F.C. players
Portsmouth F.C. players
Middlesbrough F.C. players
English Football League players
Southern Football League players
Scottish football managers
Portsmouth F.C. managers
Glenbuck Cherrypickers F.C. players
Middlesbrough Ironopolis F.C. players
Association football wing halves
Dundee F.C. players